Thanatos is an album of Relatives Menschsein collecting their output. It contains their previous albums Gefallene Engel and Die Ewigkeit.

Track listing
Disc 1:
"Prolog"–2:34
"Glaube"–6:22
"Gefallene Engel"–5:59
"Androiden"–5:39
"Epilog"–2:21
"Der Tod"–4:52
"Verbotene Triebe"–2:48
"Der Clown (Demo)"–2:06
"Lebewohl Domenique (Live)"–3:52
"Nur Gedacht (Live)"–3:11
"Sprossen zum Wahn (Live)"-4:31
"Die Ewigkeit (Live)"-6:21
"Prolog (Live)"-3:22

Disc 2:
"Verflucht"-3:36
"Ausgeblutet"-4:31
"In Gedanken"-2:32
"Erfüllung"-4:54
"Leben"-3:36
"Passion"-4:25
"Verflucht"-7:02
"Die Ewigkeit"-6:18
"Tempel (Remastered)"-3:04
"Die Zeit"-4:52
"Masken"-4:16
"Rosa Leidenschaft"-5:58

Info
 All tracks written by Lissy Mödl
 Vocals by Amadeus (Wolfgang A. Mödl)
 Guitars by Thar, Andy Age
 Keys by Jörg „Jogy“ Wolfgram, Jörg Hüttner

External links
 Thanatos at Discogs

2002 albums
Alice In... albums
Relatives Menschsein albums